The 1901 Chicago White Stockings season was their first season as a major league team, and their second season in Chicago. It was also the inaugural season of American League as a major league.

The White Stockings had a very balanced lineup, which was led by outfielders Dummy Hoy and Fielder Jones, and scored the most runs in the AL. They relied primarily on speed, as Frank Isbell, Sam Mertes, and Jones finished 1–2–3 in stolen bases. The pitching staff was anchored by Clark Griffith, who went 24–7 with a 2.67 ERA.

The White Stockings finished 83–53. They won the pennant by four games.

Offseason 
 In 1900, the Western League changed its name to the American League. It was still officially a minor league, subject to the governing National Agreement and an underling of the National League. The NL actually gave permission to the AL to put a team in Chicago, and Comiskey moved his St. Paul club to Chicago's South Side. After the season, the AL declined to renew its membership in the National Agreement, and the war was on. After acquiring a number of stars from the older league, including pitcher and manager Clark Griffith, the White Stockings also captured the AL's first major-league pennant the next year, in 1901.

Regular season 

 May 9, 1901: Earl Moore of the Cleveland Blues threw the first no-hitter in the history of the American League against the White Stockings. Chicago beat the Blues by a score of 4–2 despite not having one hit.

Season standings

Record vs. opponents

Roster

Game log 

|- align="center" bgcolor="bbffbb"
|1||April 24|| Cleveland Blues ||8–2|| 1–0
|- align="center" bgcolor="bbffbb"
|2||April 25|| Cleveland Blues||7–3|| 2–0
|- align="center" bgcolor="ffbbbb"
|3||April 27|| Cleveland Blues||4–10|| 2–1
|- align="center" bgcolor="bbffbb"
|4||April 28|| Cleveland Blues ||13–1|| 3–1
|- align="center" bgcolor="ffbbbb"
|5||April 29|| Detroit Tigers ||2–3|| 3–2
|- align="center" bgcolor="bbffbb" 
|6||April 30|| Detroit Tigers ||4–2|| 4–2
|-

|-
|- align="center" bgcolor="bbffbb" 
| 7 || May 1  ||Detroit Tigers||19–9|| 5–2
|- align="center" bgcolor="ffbbbb" 
| 8 || May 2  ||Detroit Tigers ||5–7|| 5–3
|- align="center" bgcolor="bbffbb" 
| 9 || May 3  ||@ Milwaukee Brewers ||11–3|| 6–3
|- align="center" bgcolor="bbffbb" 
| 10 || May 4 ||@ Milwaukee Brewers ||11–3|| 7–3
|- align="center" bgcolor="ffbbbb" 
| 11 || May 5 ||@ Milwaukee Brewers ||7–21|| 7–4
|- align="center" bgcolor="bbffbb" 
| 12 || May 6 ||@ Milwaukee Brewers ||6–3|| 8–4
|- align="center" bgcolor="bbffbb" 
| 13 || May 8 ||@ Cleveland Blues ||3–1|| 9–4
|- align="center" bgcolor="bbffbb" 
| 14 || May 9 ||@ Cleveland Blues ||4–2|| 10–4
|- align="center" bgcolor="bbffbb" 
| 15 || May 10 ||@ Cleveland Blues ||5–4|| 11–4
|- align="center" bgcolor="ffbbbb" 
| 16 || May 11 || @ Detroit Tigers ||4–9|| 11–5
|- align="center" bgcolor="ffbbbb" 
| 17 || May 12 || @ Detroit Tigers ||5–7|| 11–6
|- align="center" bgcolor="ffbbbb" 
| 18 || May 13 || @ Detroit Tigers ||7–8|| 11–7
|- align="center" bgcolor="bbffbb" 
| 19 || May 14 || @ Detroit Tigers ||6–2|| 12–7
|- align="center" bgcolor="bbffbb" 
| 20 || May 16 ||  Milwaukee Brewers ||14–1|| 13–7
|- align="center" bgcolor="bbffbb" 
| 21 || May 17 ||  Milwaukee Brewers ||7–6||14–7
|- align="center" bgcolor="bbffbb" 
| 22 || May 18 ||  Milwaukee Brewers ||5–3||15–7
|- align="center" bgcolor="bbffbb" 
| 23 || May 19 ||  Milwaukee Brewers ||14–3||16–7
|- align="center" bgcolor="ffbbbb" 
| 24 || May 22 ||  Philadelphia Athletics ||5–9||16–8
|- align="center" bgcolor="bbffbb" 
| 25 || May 23 ||  Philadelphia Athletics ||11–9||17–8
|- align="center" bgcolor="bbffbb" 
| 26 || May 25 ||  Philadelphia Athletics ||6–5||18–8
|- align="center" bgcolor="bbffbb" 
| 27 || May 26 ||  Baltimore Orioles ||5–0|| 19–8
|- align="center" bgcolor="bbffbb" 
| 28 || May 27 ||  Baltimore Orioles ||10–3|| 20–8
|- align="center" bgcolor="ffbbbb" 
| 29 || May 28 ||  Baltimore Orioles ||5–14|| 20–9
|- align="center" bgcolor="bbffbb" 
| 30 || May 29 ||  Baltimore Orioles ||7–4|| 21–9
|- align="center" bgcolor="bbffbb" 
| 31–1 || May 30 ||  Boston Americans ||8–3||22–9
|- align="center" bgcolor="bbffbb" 
| 32–2 || May 30 ||  Boston Americans ||5–3||23–9
|- align="center" bgcolor="bbffbb" 
| 33 || May 31 ||  Boston Americans ||10–5||24–9
|-

|-
|- align="center" bgcolor="ffbbbb" 
| 34 || June 1 ||  Boston Americans ||5–10|| 24–10
|- align="center" bgcolor="ffbbbb" 
| 35 || June 2 ||  Washington Senators ||5–7|| 24–11
|- align="center" bgcolor="ffbbbb" 
| 36 || June 3 ||  Washington Senators ||3–5|| 24–12
|- align="center" bgcolor="bbffbb" 
| 37 || June 4 ||  Washington Senators ||3–2|| 25–12
|- align="center" bgcolor="bbffbb" 
| 38 || June 7 || @ Washington Senators ||15–4|| 26–12
|- align="center" bgcolor="ffbbbb" 
| 39 || June 8 || @ Washington Senators ||3–8|| 26–13
|- align="center" bgcolor="bbffbb" 
| 40 || June 10 || @ Washington Senators ||13–10|| 27–13
|- align="center" bgcolor="ffbbbb" 
| 41 || June 11 || @ Washington Senators ||1–3|| 27–14
|- align="center" bgcolor="ffbbbb" 
| 42 || June 12 || @ Baltimore Orioles ||1–8|| 27–15
|- align="center" bgcolor="bbffbb" 
| 43 || June 13 || @ Baltimore Orioles ||12–0|| 28–15
|- align="center" bgcolor="bbffbb" 
| 44 || June 14 || @ Baltimore Orioles ||10–5|| 29–15
|- align="center" bgcolor="ffbbbb" 
| 45–1 || June 17 ||@ Boston Americans ||1–11|| 29–16
|- align="center" bgcolor="ffbbbb" 
| 46–2 || June 17 ||@ Boston Americans ||4–10|| 29–17
|- align="center" bgcolor="ffbbbb" 
| 47 || June 18 || @ Boston Americans  ||3–4|| 29–18
|- align="center" bgcolor="ffbbbb" 
| 48 || June 19 || @ Boston Americans  ||3–5|| 29–19
|- align="center" bgcolor="ffbbbb" 
| 49 || June 20 || @ Boston Americans   ||3–4|| 29–20
|- align="center" bgcolor="bbffbb" 
| 50 || June 21 || @ Philadelphia Athletics ||4–0|| 30–20
|- align="center" bgcolor="bbffbb" 
| 51 || June 22 || @ Philadelphia Athletics ||6–4|| 31–20
|- align="center" bgcolor="bbffbb" 
| 52 || June 24 || @ Philadelphia Athletics ||7–5|| 32–20
|- align="center" bgcolor="bbffbb" 
| 53 || June 25 || @ Philadelphia Athletics ||5–0|| 33–20
|- align="center" bgcolor="bbffbb" 
| 54 || June 27 ||  Cleveland Blues ||5–1|| 34–20
|- align="center" bgcolor="bbffbb" 
| 55 || June 28 ||  Cleveland Blues ||7–6|| 35–20
|- align="center" bgcolor="bbffbb" 
| 56 || June 29 ||  Cleveland Blues ||4–1|| 36–20
|- align="center" bgcolor="bbffbb" 
| 57 || June 30 ||  Detroit Tigers ||4–2|| 37–20
|-

|-
|- align="center" bgcolor="bbffbb" 
| 58 || July 2 ||  Detroit Tigers ||3–2|| 38–20
|- align="center" bgcolor="bbffbb" 
| 59 || July 3 || @ Cleveland Blues ||4–3|| 39–20
|- align="center" bgcolor="ffbbbb" 
| 60–1 || July 4 || @ Cleveland Blues ||2–8|| 39–21
|- align="center" bgcolor="ffbbbb" 
| 61–2 || July 4 || @ Cleveland Blues ||5–6|| 39–22
|- align="center" bgcolor="bbffbb" 
| 62 || July 5 || @ Detroit Tigers ||8–4|| 40–22
|- align="center" bgcolor="ffbbbb" 
| 63 || July 6 || @ Detroit Tigers ||5–6|| 40–23
|- align="center" bgcolor="ffbbbb" 
| 64 || July 7 || @ Detroit Tigers ||3–8|| 40–24
|- align="center" bgcolor="bbffbb" 
| 65 || July 9 || @ Milwaukee Brewers ||17–9|| 41–24
|- align="center" bgcolor="bbffbb" 
| 66 || July 10 || @ Milwaukee Brewers ||5–4|| 42–24
|- align="center" bgcolor="bbffbb" 
| 67 || July 11 || @ Milwaukee Brewers ||5–1|| 43–24
|- align="center" bgcolor="bbffbb" 
| 68 || July 12 ||  Milwaukee Brewers ||14–1|| 44–24
|- align="center" bgcolor="ffbbbb" 
| 69 || July 13 ||  Milwaukee Brewers ||2–3|| 44–25
|- align="center" bgcolor="bbffbb" 
| 70 || July 14 ||  Milwaukee Brewers ||4–0|| 45–25
|- align="center" bgcolor="bbffbb" 
| 71 || July 17 ||  Baltimore Orioles ||4–2|| 46–25
|- align="center" bgcolor="bbffbb" 
| 72 || July 18 ||  Baltimore Orioles ||9–1|| 47–25
|- align="center" bgcolor="ffbbbb" 
| 73 || July 19 ||  Baltimore Orioles ||4–7|| 47–26
|- align="center" bgcolor="ffbbbb" 
| 74 || July 20 ||  Philadelphia Athletics ||6–8|| 47–27
|- align="center" bgcolor="bbffbb" 
| 75 || July 21 ||  Philadelphia Athletics ||9–4|| 48–27
|- align="center" bgcolor="ffbbbb" 
| 76 || July 22 ||  Philadelphia Athletics ||1–2|| 48–28
|- align="center" bgcolor="bbffbb" 
| 77 || July 23 ||  Philadelphia Athletics ||10–6|| 49–28
|- align="center" bgcolor="bbffbb" 
| 78 || July 24 ||  Washington Senators ||17–3|| 50–28
|- align="center" bgcolor="bbffbb" 
| 79 || July 25 ||  Washington Senators ||4–1 || 51–28
|- align="center" bgcolor="bbffbb" 
| 80 || July 26 ||  Washington Senators ||2–1|| 52–28
|- align="center" bgcolor="bbffbb" 
| 81 || July 27 ||  Boston Americans ||8–7|| 53–28
|- align="center" bgcolor="ffbbbb" 
| 82 || July 29 ||  Boston Americans ||1–4|| 53–29
|- align="center" bgcolor="bbffbb" 
| 83 || July 31 ||  Detroit Tigers ||2–0|| 54–29
|-

|-
|- align="center" bgcolor="bbffbb" 
| 84 || August 1 ||  Detroit Tigers ||4–0|| 55–29
|- align="center" bgcolor="bbffbb" 
| 85 || August 2 ||  Detroit Tigers ||7–0|| 56–29
|- align="center" bgcolor="ffbbbb" 
| 86 || August 3 ||  Detroit Tigers ||6–8|| 56–30
|- align="center" bgcolor="bbffbb" 
| 87 || August 4 ||  Cleveland Blues ||9–5|| 57–30
|- align="center" bgcolor="ffbbbb" 
| 88 || August 5 ||  Cleveland Blues ||3–6|| 57–31
|- align="center" bgcolor="ffbbbb" 
| 89 || August 7 || @ Detroit Tigers ||3–9|| 57–32
|- align="center" bgcolor="bbffbb" 
| 90 || August 8 || @ Detroit Tigers ||18–8|| 58–32
|- align="center" bgcolor="ffbbbb" 
| 91 || August 9 || @ Detroit Tigers ||1–12|| 58–33
|- align="center" bgcolor="ffbbbb" 
| 92 || August 10 || @ Cleveland Blues ||7–11|| 58–34
|- align="center" bgcolor="ffbbbb" 
| 93 || August 11 ||  Cleveland Blues  ||3–4|| 58–35
|- align="center" bgcolor="bbffbb" 
| 94 || August 12 || @ Cleveland Blues ||17–2|| 59–35
|- align="center" bgcolor="ffbbbb" 
| 95–1 || August 13 || @ Cleveland Blues ||0–4|| 59–36
|- align="center" bgcolor="bbffbb" 
| 96–2 || August 13 || @ Cleveland Blues ||14–1|| 60–36
|- align="center" bgcolor="ffbbbb" 
| 97 || August 16 ||  @ Boston Americans ||2–6|| 60–37
|- align="center" bgcolor="ffbbbb" 
| 98 || August 17 ||  @ Boston Americans ||2–4|| 60–38
|- align="center" bgcolor="ffbbbb" 
| 99 || August 19 || @ Washington Senators ||2–5|| 60–39
|- align="center" bgcolor="bbffbb" 
| 100 || August 20 || @ Washington Senators ||9–3|| 61–39
|- align="center" bgcolor="ffbbbb" 
| 101 || August 21 || @ Washington Senators ||0–8|| 61–40
|- align="center" bgcolor="bbffbb" 
| 102 || August 22 || @ Baltimore Orioles||6–5|| 62–40
|- align="center" bgcolor="bbffbb" 
| 103 || August 23 || @ Baltimore Orioles||6–4|| 63–40
|- align="center" bgcolor="ffbbbb" 
| 104 || August 24 || @ Baltimore Orioles ||4–10|| 63–41
|- align="center" bgcolor="bbffbb" 
| 105 || August 26 || @ Philadelphia Athletics||11–4|| 64–41
|- align="center" bgcolor="ffbbbb" 
| 106 || August 27 || @ Philadelphia Athletics||5–7|| 64–42
|- align="center" bgcolor="bbffbb" 
| 107 || August 28 || @ Philadelphia Athletics ||3–0||65–42
|- align="center" bgcolor="bbbbff" 
| 108 || August 30 ||  Baltimore Orioles ||5–5|| 65 – 42 – 1
|- align="center" bgcolor="bbffbb" 
| 109–1 || August 31 ||  Baltimore Orioles||12–2|| 66 – 42 – 1
|- align="center" bgcolor="bbffbb" 
| 110–2 || August 31 ||  Baltimore Orioles ||5–2|| 67 – 42 – 1
|-

|-
|- align="center" bgcolor="bbffbb" 
| 111 || September 1 ||  Baltimore Orioles ||6–3|| 68 – 42 – 1
|- align="center" bgcolor="bbffbb" 
| 112–1 || September 2 ||  Philadelphia Athletics ||2–0|| 69 – 42 – 1
|- align="center" bgcolor="ffbbbb" 
| 113–2 || September 2 ||  Philadelphia Athletics||9–10|| 69 – 43 – 1
|- align="center" bgcolor="ffbbbb" 
| 114 || September 3 || Philadelphia Athletics||2–3|| 69 – 44 – 1
|- align="center" bgcolor="bbffbb" 
| 115 || September 4 ||  Washington Senators ||9–5|| 70 – 44 – 1
|- align="center" bgcolor="bbffbb" 
| 116–1 || September 5 ||  Washington Senators||4–3|| 71 – 44 – 1
|- align="center" bgcolor="ffbbbb" 
| 117–2 || September 5 ||  Washington Senators ||7–9|| 71 – 45 – 1
|- align="center" bgcolor="ffbbbb" 
| 118 || September 6 ||  Washington Senators ||3–5|| 71 – 46 – 1
|- align="center" bgcolor="bbffbb" 
| 119 || September 7 ||  Boston Americans ||4–1|| 72 – 46 – 1
|- align="center" bgcolor="bbffbb" 
| 120 || September 8 ||  Boston Americans ||4–3|| 73 – 46 – 1
|- align="center" bgcolor="bbffbb" 
| 121–1 || September 9 ||  Boston Americans||4–3|| 74 – 46 – 1
|- align="center" bgcolor="bbffbb" 
| 122–2 || September 9 ||  Boston Americans ||6–4|| 75 – 46 – 1
|- align="center" bgcolor="bbffbb" 
| 123 || September 10 || @ Milwaukee Brewers ||6–3|| 76 – 46 – 1
|- align="center" bgcolor="ffbbbb" 
| 124–1 || September 12 || @ Milwaukee Brewers ||1–5|| 76 – 47 – 1
|- align="center" bgcolor="bbffbb" 
| 125–2 || September 12 || @ Milwaukee Brewers||4–0||77 – 47 – 1
|- align="center" bgcolor="ffbbbb" 
| 126 || September 13 ||  Milwaukee Brewers ||3–5|| 77 – 48 – 1
|- align="center" bgcolor="bbffbb" 
| 127–1 || September 15 ||  Milwaukee Brewers ||5–4|| 78 – 48 – 1
|- align="center" bgcolor="bbffbb" 
| 128–2 || September 15 ||  Milwaukee Brewers ||9–4|| 79 – 48 – 1
|- align="center" bgcolor="bbffbb" 
| 129–1 || September 18 || @ Baltimore Orioles ||10–3|| 80 – 48 – 1
|- align="center" bgcolor="bbffbb" 
| 130–2 || September 18 || @ Baltimore Orioles ||5–1|| 81 – 48 – 1
|- align="center" bgcolor="bbffbb" 
| 131 || September 20 || @ Philadelphia Athletics ||8–3|| 82 – 48 – 1
|- align="center" bgcolor="ffbbbb" 
| 132 || September 21 || @ Philadelphia Athletics ||4–10|| 82 – 49 – 1
|- align="center" bgcolor="ffbOakland Athletics|bbb" 
| 133 || September 23 || @ Philadelphia Athletics ||3–5||82 – 50 – 1 
|- align="center" bgcolor="ffbbbb" 
| 134 || September 24 || @ Boston Americans ||3–8|| 82 – 51 – 1
|- align="center" bgcolor="ffbbbb" 
| 135 || September 25 || @ Boston Americans ||2–5||82 – 52 – 1
|- align="center" bgcolor="ffbbbb" 
| 136 || September 26 || @ Boston Americans ||2–3||82 – 53 – 1
|- align="center" bgcolor="bbffbb" 
| 137 || September 27 || @ Washington Senators || 6–4 ||83 – 53 – 1
|-

Player stats

Batting

Starters by position 
Note: Pos = Position; G = Games played; AB = At bats; R = Runs scored; H = Hits; 2B = Doubles; 3B = Triples; Avg.= Batting average; HR = Home runs; RBI = Runs batted in; SB = Stolen bases

Other batters 
Note: G = Games played; AB = At bats; R = Runs scored; H = Hits; 2B = Doubles; 3B = Triples; Avg. = Batting average; HR = Home runs; RBI = Runs batted in; SB = Stolen bases

Pitching

Starting pitchers 
Note: G = Games pitched; GS = Games started; IP = Innings pitched; W = Wins; L = Losses; ERA = Earned run average; BB = Walks allowed; K = Strikeouts

Other pitchers 
Note: G = Games pitched; GS = Games started; IP = Innings pitched; W = Wins; L = Losses; SV = Saves; ERA = Earned run average; BB = Walks allowed; K = Strikeouts

Relief pitchers 
Note: G = Games pitched; IP = Innings pitched; W = Wins; L = Losses; SV = Saves; ERA = Earned run average; BB = Walks allowed; K = Strikeouts

Individual league top five finishes 
Nixey Callahan
 #2 in AL in earned run average (2.42)

Clark Griffith
 AL leader in shutouts (5)
 #3 in AL in wins (24)
 #4 in AL in earned run average (2.67)

Dummy Hoy
 #4 in AL in runs scored (112)
 #4 in AL in on-base percentage (.407)

Frank Isbell
 MLB leader in stolen bases (52)

Fielder Jones
 #2 in AL in runs scored (120)
 #2 in AL in on-base percentage (.412)
 #3 in AL in stolen bases (38)
 #4 in AL in runs batted in (98)

Sam Mertes
 #2 in AL in stolen bases (46)

Roy Patterson
 #2 in AL in strikeouts (127)
 #3 in AL in shutouts (4)

References 

1901 Chicago White Stockings team page at Baseball Reference
Chicago White Stockings team page at www.baseball-almanac.com

Chicago White Sox seasons
Chicago White Stockings season
American League champion seasons
Chicago White